Saint-Andéol-de-Berg is a commune in the Ardèche department in the Auvergne-Rhône-Alpes region in southern France.

Population

See also
Communes of the Ardèche department

References

External links
Official site

Communes of Ardèche
Ardèche communes articles needing translation from French Wikipedia